Timothy A. Miller (born 1944) is a professor of Religious Studies at the University of Kansas at Lawrence. He has been involved in the Communal Studies Association (US) and Utopian Studies Society (Europe), and is past president of the International Communal Studies Association (Israel). He has a particular interest in intentional communities and new religious movements.
His son is Aber Miller, noted 'sweetheart jazz man' of Humboldt County.

Bibliography

References

External links
Timothy Miller's Curriculum Vitae

Living people
University of Kansas faculty
American religion academics
Researchers of new religious movements and cults
1944 births